The Bayda and Baniyas massacres were two widely reported massacres that occurred in May 2013 in the village of Bayda and the city of Baniyas, in Tartus Governorate, Syria, where Syrian Army troops, supported by paramilitaries, killed civilians in the predominantly Sunni locales. The killings were supposedly in retaliation for an earlier rebel attack near the town that left at least half a dozen soldiers dead.

There were reports of whole families being killed in the two massacres 2–3 May, and thousands were attempting to flee the area. At least 100 people were killed, while others say that number exceeds 400. Human Rights Watch put the number of dead at 248 in mass summary executions. According to a UN report, between 300 and 450 people were killed (150-250 respectively 150–200). Survivors have testified that it was regular troops, backed by the paramilitary National Defence Force (NDF), that entered the village and began "a murderous attack: burning, looting and killing".

Events

Soldiers killed
Early on 2 May 2013, rebels fought with government troops near Bayda. Activists said a bus carrying pro-government militants, known as Shabiha, was attacked, killing seven and wounding 20–30. Syrian forces and Shabiha militiamen from the surrounding area returned in the afternoon and stormed the village.

Village raided
Syrian troops backed by the pro-government gunmen swept into the village in the mountains near the Mediterranean coast killing dozens of people, including women and children, and torching homes. Before the militia entered the village, the military bombarded Bayda from the sea with rockets.

The UK-based Syrian Observatory for Human Rights stated they were able to document the deaths of 51 people. Another activist report documented 72 deaths. Opposition activists said that, although Bayda was rebel-held, only 14 rebel fighters were in the village. One opposition activist stated that the attack was in fact retaliation for another attack in a neighbouring area four days previously that had resulted in the death of several soldiers.

Victims included Bayda's former village imam of 30 years, Sheikh Biyasi, described as "a government loyalist who alienated local people with his political views before resigning two years ago." According to one survivor, "even though he always opposed the protests, they still killed him." The Biyasi family was described by Reuters as suffering "some of the worst losses, with 36 documented deaths".

Baniyas massacre
On 3 May, another massacre was, according to SOHR, perpetrated in the Ras al-Nabaa district of Baniyas causing hundreds of Sunni residents to flee their homes. According to one opposition report, a total of 77 civilians, including 14 children, were killed. Another two opposition groups documented, by name, 96-145 people who are thought to have been executed in the district. Four pro-government militiamen and two soldiers were also killed in the area in clashes with rebel fighters.

Syrian state media stated their forces were seeking only to clear the area of "terrorists". Mihrac Ural, a pro-government militia commander spoke of the necessity to besiege and "cleanse" Baniyas from what he called "traitors". In all, the military claimed that they killed 40 "terrorists" in Bayda and Baniyas.

References

External links
'No Ones Left' hrw report
channel4.com al bayda massacre war crime video

Military operations of the Syrian civil war in 2013
Massacres of the Syrian civil war perpetrated by the Syrian Army
Baniyas
Shia–Sunni sectarian violence